Caujul District is one of six districts of the province Oyón in Peru.

See also 
 Mataqucha

References